Genchū Yoteki (源註余摘) is a commentary on The Tale of Genji by the Edo period kokugaku scholar Ishikawa Masamochi. It criticizes earlier Edo commentaries by Keichū and others, based on Masamochi's original linguistic scholarship. Its date is unknown, but it took its current form at some point between 1799 and 1830. It is in 54 books (matching the 54 books of Genji), and has been published in various numbers of volumes, most commonly 20.

Overview 
Ishikawa Masamochi's commentary on The Tale of Genji, Genchū Yoteki, is in 54 books divided between 20 volumes. The exact date the work was written is uncertain, but it cites Motoori Norinaga's commentary , which was published in Kansei 11 (1799), and Masamochi died in Bunsei 13 (1830), so it must have been taken its current form between these dates.

Background 

Contents 
A unique feature of Masamochi's commentary is that, in his work to correct the errors of older commentaries, he built on the works of Keichū (Genchū Shūi), Kamo no Mabuchi (Genji Monogatari Shinshaku) and Norinaga (Tama no Ogushi). When accepting or rejecting the theories of these more recent authors, he gave appropriate rationales for his choices. In addition to collecting and commenting on earlier scholars' research, he provides his own original analysis based on copious examples. Much of his commentary focuses on linguistic analysis of individual words based on their usage in multiple texts.

, in his article on the Genchū Yoteki for the Nihon Koten Bungaku Daijiten, praised it as showing a clear critical eye that builds on a broad scholarly basis.

Textual tradition 
20-volume editions of the Genchū Yoteki include those in the holdings of the National Diet Library and the University of Tokyo, while Jissen Women's University and the Tokyo Metropolitan Central Library (Ichimura Bunko) have 54-volume editions. There are also other variant copies, such as the ten-volume edition in the  Kannarai Archives (神習文庫).

References

Works cited 

 

The Tale of Genji
Edo-period works